Universidad Técnica de Cajamarca (usually referred to as UTC) is the biggest Peruvian football club in the city of Cajamarca, Peru. It was founded in 1964 and play in the Torneo Descentralizado which is the top flight of the Peruvian league.

History
UTC was officially founded on 14 July 1964 by Oswaldo Silva Marín and Wílder Tejada Arribasplata, clerks at Universidad Técnica de Cajamarca, known today as Universidad Nacional de Cajamarca (National University of Cajamarca), with the aim of giving the university a place in the local soccer league. Prior to that date, the club had been playing for three months in the local league alongside Club Juventud Victoria as one team, before the official foundation date.

In 1970, UTC wins the local league of the District of Cajamarca.

The club was 1981 Copa Perú champion, when it defeated Atlético Grau, Juventud La Palma, Deportivo Garcilaso, and Sportivo Huracán.

The club have played at the highest level of Peruvian football on twelve occasions, from 1982 Torneo Descentralizado until 1993 Torneo Descentralizado when was relegated.

In the 2011 Torneo Intermedio, the club was eliminated by Real Garcilaso in the Round of 16.

In the 2011 Copa Perú, the club classified to the National Stage, but was eliminated by Los Caimanes.

UTC won the 2012 Copa Perú under manager Rafael Castillo after defeating Alfonso Ugarte in the final. The club won 2–0 at home in Cajamarca and lost 3–2 in Puno, but won due to a better goal difference. With the win, they qualified for the 2013 Torneo Descentralizado, the top flight of Peruvian football; they finished sixth and classified for the second international tournament in their history, the 2014 Copa Sudamericana.

Honours

National

League
Peruvian Primera División:
Runner-up (1): 1985

Torneo de Verano:
Runner-up (1): 2017

Copa Perú:
Winners (2): 1981, 2012
Runner-up (1): 1996

Regional
Región II: 
Winners (4): 1998, 2005, 2011, 2012
Runner-up (1): 2003

Liga Departamental de Cajamarca: 
Winners (13): 1971, 1972, 1973, 1974, 1979, 1995, 1996, 1997, 1998, 2001, 2002, 2003, 2011
Runner-up (2): 2004, 2005

Liga Superior de Cajamarca: 
Winners (1): 2011

Liga Provincial de Cajamarca: 
Winners (3): 1971, 2002, 2003

Liga Distrital de Cajamarca: 
Winners (11): 1970, 1971, 1972, 1973, 1974, 1975, 1976, 1977, 1978, 1979, 1980

Performance in CONMEBOL competitions

A = appearances, P = matches played, W = won, D = drawn, L = lost, GF = goals for, GA = goals against.

Players

Notable players

Managers
 César "Chalaca" González (May 5, 2011–1?)
 Rafael Castillo (Jan 10, 2012–14)
 Carlos Galván (2014)
 José Eugenio Hernández (2014–15)
 Javier Arce (2015)
 Rafael Castillo (2015–)

See also
List of football clubs in Peru
Peruvian football league system

References 

Football clubs in Peru
Association football clubs established in 1964